Shirakamut is a village in the Lori Province of Armenia.
The town was the epicenter of 1988 Armenian earthquake.

Toponymy 
The village is also known as Shirakarnut and previously as Nalband.

References

External links 

 
 World Gazeteer: Armenia – World-Gazetteer.com

Populated places in Lori Province